The Dorchester Bridge is a bridge in Quebec City which was built by Asa Porter and opened on 24 September 1789. The bridge was named after Guy Carleton, 1st Baron Dorchester and was the first permanent bridge in Quebec City. The bridge crossed the Saint-Charles River near its mouth, connecting to Craig Street.

In 1822 the bridge was rebuilt and moved slightly to the west. The new structure was built by Anthony Hedley Anderson and his partner, a Mr. Smith, and was operated as a toll bridge. The long wooden structure included a drawbridge to allow ships to pass.

References

Bridges in Quebec City
Bridges completed in 1789
Road bridges in Quebec
Former toll bridges in Canada
1789 establishments in the British Empire